Ken Forkish is an American chef and author who owned Ken's Artisan Bakery and Ken's Artisan Pizza. Previously based in Portland, Oregon, Forkish has retired and relocated to Hawaii.

See also
 James Beard Foundation Award: 2010s
 List of people from Portland, Oregon
 Pizza in Portland, Oregon

References

Year of birth missing (living people)
Living people
American bakers
American chefs
American male chefs
American writers
Writers from Portland, Oregon